The Oceania Athletics Association (OAA) is the governing body for the sport of athletics in Oceania. The OAA head office is located in Varsity Lakes, Gold Coast, Queensland, Australia.

History
The OAA was founded as Oceania Amateur Athletic Organization (OAAA) on August 21, 1969, during a "Congress of the delegates of Member Countries of the Australasian Area" held in Port Moresby, then Territory of Papua and New Guinea, at the time of the 3rd South Pacific Games.  The name was changed to Oceania Athletics Organization (OAA) in February 2007.

Presidents
The current president of the association, Robin Sapong Eugenios (Northern Marianas) was
firstly elected in December 2019 at the OAA Special Congress.

Competitions
The OAA holds the following championships:
 
Oceania Combined Events Championships
Oceania Cross Country Championships
Oceania Marathon and Half Marathon Championships
Oceania Race Walking Championships
 Oceania Championships
Oceania Area Championships
Oceania Junior Championships
Oceania Youth Championships

Moreover, the following regional championships were organized:

Melanesian Championships
Micronesian Championships
Polynesian Championships

In 2011, a new regional concept was introduced, and the three regional championships and the Oceania Championships were unified to the Oceania Regional (or Area) Championships,  or simply again Oceania Championships.  Two regions "East" and "West" were classified.   Athletes from the two regions may compete together at the championships, but results will be separated for rankings purposes, and medals are awarded separately.

Member associations

Associate member associations
A modification of Article 4.2 of World Athletics constitution set new rules limiting its membership as follows:
"The national governing body for Athletics in any Country or Territory shall
be eligible for Membership. Members that represented Territories on
31 December 2005 shall continue to be Members. No new Territories shall
be admitted to the Membership."

As a consequence, the OAA made constitutional amendments to its Article 2.5, introducing an associate membership to allow territories like New Caledonia, Niue, and Wallis and Futuna to participate officially "in OAA activities, including area and regional competitions". This also applies for Tokelau, where the first athletics event ever took place recently.

In 2008, New Caledonia became the first associate member, Niue followed in 2009.

See also

References

External links
 OAA official website

Athletics organizations
Ath
Athletics in Oceania
Sports organizations established in 1969
1969 establishments in Oceania